Pylypchuk is the surname of the following people

Jon Pylypchuk (born in 1972), Canadian sculptor and painter
Roman Pylypchuk (born in 1967), Ukrainian football player and coach
Serhiy Pylypchuk (born in 1984), Ukrainian football player
Volodymyr Pylypchuk (born in 1948), Ukrainian politician

See also
Sviatlana Tsikhanouskaya (born in 1984), Belarus political leader, born Pilipchuk